Captain Hawa Singh Plaza aka Triprayar Sports and Games Association Indoor Stadium is the first of its kind rural Indoor stadium in India, located in Triprayar in Thrissur District, Kerala. The stadium is registered under Charitable Trust Act by Triprayar Sports & Games Association who owns the stadium. 2013 National Games of India Boxing event will be held in this stadium.

References 

Indoor arenas in Kerala
Indoor arenas in India
Sports venues in Thrissur
Volleyball venues in India
Sports venues completed in 2013
2013 establishments in Kerala